Lars Björn Gustafsson (born 19 February 1986) is a Swedish comedian and actor. He is known from TV shows such as Parlamentet and Stockholm Live.

Early and personal life
Gustafsson was born in Gothenburg, Sweden. He studied at the Calle Flygares Theater School in Stockholm to become an actor. His film debut came in 2006 with the Swedish movie Beck – Flickan i jordkällaren. But before his debut as an actor, he had already debuted in 2005 as a stand-up comedian at Bungy Comedy, a Swedish club for stand-up beginners. In 2006 he enrolled at Standup Star, a stand-up school, where among others, Özz Nûjen and Jakob Öqvist, two of the most well-known comedians in Sweden, have attended.

Career
In 2008, he appeared on Melodifestivalen 2008, the Swedish selections for the Eurovision Song Contest. He sang a song to Kristian Luuk's (the host) girlfriend Carina Berg. In his song he declared his love for her. Afterward, Berg said that she had to hide her cheeks so people couldn't see that she was blushing.

Gustafsson gained a certain degree of international fame following a World of Warcraft (WoW) joke in Parlamentet, talking about people wasting time on the internet and not contributing to their party's effort by playing inefficiently, using so much internal WoW terminology himself that he was incomprehensible to non-players. The scene was spread over the Internet, mainly on YouTube, where translations into other languages could also be found.

In 2008, Björn received big media attention by great efforts in Parlamentet and as an entertainer in the intervals of Melodifestivalen. He also got voted as Sweden's funniest man by Aftonbladet's readers on 6 March 2008. He also read the Swedish votes at the Eurovision Song Contest 2008. He continued his "stand-up" shows at the big stage, in the 44th Guldbagge Awards in 2009 together with Johan Glans, and with Robert Gustafsson in the Svenska idrottsgalan 2009 (Swedish athletics awards) where he also presented the nominations for rookie of the year.

Since 2016, he plays the role of Don in the American comedy television series People of Earth.

Films
Beck – Flickan i jordkällaren (2006)
Les Grandes Personnes (2008)
Kenny Begins (2009)
Björn Gustafsson: A life's Work
Tina og Betina The Movie
Kronjuvelerna (2011)
Cockpit (2012)
Spy (2015)
 Kung Fury (2015)
 Becoming Astrid (2018)

Television shows
Eurovision Song Contest 2008
Melodifestivalen 2008 (pause act)
Parlamentet
Extra! Extra!
Tack gode gud
Morgonsoffan
Sverige pussas och kramas
Stockholm Live
Idol
Hål i väggen
Kontoret
Julkalendern: Barna Hedenhös uppfinner julen
Söder om Folkungagatan
The Comedians (one episode as Jonas)
People of Earth (Don)

Awards 
Swedish Funniest Man 2008 by the newspaper Aftonbladet.

References

External links 

Official website (Swedish)

1986 births
Swedish male comedians
Living people
Swedish male television actors
Swedish male film actors
Swedish expatriates in Norway
21st-century Swedish male actors
21st-century Swedish comedians